The Mahanuwara Polling Division is a Polling Division in the Kandy Electoral District, in the Central Province, Sri Lanka.

Presidential Election Results

Summary 

The winner of Mahanuwara has matched the final country result 4 out of 8 times.

2019 Sri Lankan Presidential Election

2015 Sri Lankan Presidential Election

2010 Sri Lankan Presidential Election

2005 Sri Lankan Presidential Election

1999 Sri Lankan Presidential Election

1994 Sri Lankan Presidential Election

1988 Sri Lankan Presidential Election

1982 Sri Lankan Presidential Election

Parliamentary Election Results

Summary 

The winner of Mahanuwara has matched the final country result 3 out of 7 times.

2015 Sri Lankan Parliamentary Election

2010 Sri Lankan Parliamentary Election

2004 Sri Lankan Parliamentary Election

2001 Sri Lankan Parliamentary Election

2000 Sri Lankan Parliamentary Election

1994 Sri Lankan Parliamentary Election

1989 Sri Lankan Parliamentary Election

Demographics

Ethnicity 

The Mahanuwara Polling Division has a Sinhalese majority (70.6%), a significant Sri Lankan Tamil population (11.3%) and a significant Moor population (11.2%) . In comparison, the Kandy Electoral District (which contains the Mahanuwara Polling Division) has a Sinhalese majority (74.4%) and a significant Moor population (13.9%)

Religion 

The Mahanuwara Polling Division has a Buddhist majority (67.2%), a significant Hindu population (13.5%) and a significant Muslim population (12.6%) . In comparison, the Kandy Electoral District (which contains the Mahanuwara Polling Division) has a Buddhist majority (73.4%) and a significant Muslim population (14.3%)

References 

Polling Divisions of Sri Lanka
Polling Divisions of the Kandy Electoral District